Dikson may refer to
Dikson Island, a Russian island in the Kara Sea
Dikson (urban-type settlement), a port urban-type settlement in Krasnoyarsk Krai, Russia
Dikson Airport, airport in the urban-type settlement of Dikson
Dikson (icebreaker), a Russian icebreaker

See also
Dixon (disambiguation)
Dickson (disambiguation)
Dickson (surname)

ru:Диксон